Civil-Military Co-operation (CIMIC) is the means by which a military commander connects with civilian agencies active in a theater of operations.

CIMIC activities are coordinated via the "G9" staff branch of a divisional, or other, headquarters. In high-level tri-service, or joint headquarters (JHQ), the department is termed "J9".

History
The United States Army since the Second World War has maintained civil affairs units. Part of their function includes CIMIC tasks, however, they have a much broader function and a different focus from most other CIMIC organizations. In the mid-1990s, primarily in response to lessons learned in Bosnia and Herzegovina and Kosovo, most NATO members began developing their own CIMIC structures, which lead to the establishment of the Civil-Military Cooperation Centre of Excellence in The Hague in 2001. Germany maintains its own centre.

Operations

For most civilians, whether private citizens, national or international non-governmental organizations (NGOs), or the official local administration, the most obvious indicator of the presence of a CIMIC organization for their area will be a designated "CIMIC Centre". The center is advertised as such and is the designated point of contact (POC) for civilians with a problem that they believe the local military could solve.

However, formal structures, organizations and personnel are not the only means of conducting CIMIC functions: each soldier that has an inter-action, whether a deliberate or a chance, with a civilian, has the capacity either to reinforce the CIMIC mission, or to undermine it. All troops to be deployed in an operation should have a briefing on the CIMIC function and the set procedures they should adopt to assist the mission.

The military units involved with civilians in a post-conflict scenario, are usually: the engineers, medical and, in many developing countries, veterinary. Typical problems include restoration of water supply, sewerage, garbage services, health clinics and veterinary clinics. Other requests may include demands for bridge repairs (frequently destroyed in conflicts and entailing arduous detours), road repairs (often damaged post-conflict by heavy vehicles, especially tracked, and the sheer scale of military traffic) and restoration of electricity supply.

CIMIC functions usually require some degree of language instruction and, where color, creed, and culture, differ, some cultural training. For the ordinary soldier, a small vocabulary of greetings and key phrases will function as an ice breaker, whilst CIMIC units might have individuals with more workable language skills. Both should have, and have access to, locally employed civilians [LEC] as interpreters to clarify formal arrangements. Training in basic cultural 'Dos and Don'ts' will avoid unintended offensive behaviors.

Doctrine
The key document explaining NATO CIMIC doctrine is Allied Joint Publication 9. It outlines the three core functions of CIMIC, those being:
Support to the Force: any activity designed to create support  the military force,  within the indigenous population.
Civil-Military Liaison: coordination and joint planning  civilian agencies, in support of the military mission.
Support to the Civil Environment: the provision of any of a variety of forms of assistance (expertise, information, security, infrastructure, capacity-building, etc.)  the local population, in support of the military mission.

CIMIC is both a function and a capability. As a result, there are soldiers in most NATO armies specifically trained and employed in CIMIC. At the same time, most soldiers on most operations conduct some CIMIC business in their day-to-day operations. CIMIC Operators do not have a monopoly on CIMIC activities. They are meant to provide commanders with expertise and advice on CIMIC matters.

CIMIC works as a force multiplier. For example, by building relationships with officials from non-governmental organizations or local government officials, CIMIC personnel might become aware of a specific threat to the mission. In so doing, they have the opportunity to alert the commander, who can then deploy resources to deal with the threat. Rather than having to post patrols on every street corner, the commander's access to information gathered by CIMIC teams has allowed him to employ a smaller number of soldiers, and to use the soldiers he does have available in other areas.

NATO CIMIC reporting

There is a vital need for translating relevant information into CIMIC knowledge.

A NATO working group is trying to solve this problem by establishing a CIMIC reporting system that allows information sharing by the CIMIC staff from the tactical to the strategic level.

In current operations, the CIMIC staffs are overwhelmed by a huge information flow. To facilitate their work, a CECIL working group has developed practical tools. The aim is to improve CIMIC assessments and develop a smoother information flow within the CIMIC "stove pipe" as well as a better horizontal distribution and sharing of pertinent info with the rest of the staff.

There is a need to improve collaboration between NATO and civilian partners in an operation. Today, the lack of a common database for information sharing is one of the main obstacles.

The system has been tested and has also proven to be a useful tool to consolidate/collect data for the Afghan Country Stability Picture (ACSP).

The CECIL Working Group discovered that there are a lot of different formats for CIMIC reporting. There is a tendency at every HQ to create their own reports in the absence of detailed guidelines.

Reporting history

During the Partnership for Peace (PFP) Exercise VIKING '05, representatives from SHAPE and JFC Brunssum discovered the need for better CIMIC reporting. The ACOSs from ACO at SHAPE and NATO's operational headquarters (JFC Brunssum, JFC Naples and JC Lisbon) discussed the issue and established in May 2006 the CECIL Working Group (WG). The WG consists of CIMIC staff officers, one from SHAPE and three from the J(F)C HQs. In addition, subject matter experts can be called upon hen needed. The WG meets every second month. A Sub-WG for training and education was established and supports the introduction of the CECIL system.

Output of CECIL WG
The WG developed a package with proposals, which consists of three "tools": The CIMIC situation report itself, the CIMIC tracking system and a standardized commander's update.

ISAF CJ9 and JFC Brunssum J9 have used this CIMIC situation report on a weekly base since February 2007; the regional commands will be introduced to the new reporting system soon. The topic was already briefed at NATO School in Oberammergau, Germany, in the new CIMIC staff officer's course.

Summary
"This CECIL-tool is ideal for the CIMIC branches to manage their information which assists to stabilize the mission area. Information sharing through one database is essential for civilian and military partners." CECIL is designed to focus on the most important issues. The Afghan Country Stability Picture gives operators at all levels the relevant facts in an efficient and convenient package.

The output of the working group so far is quite promising. The working group will be mandated for another year to continue working on the new established CIMIC information-sharing platform.

Additional information

CIMIC
Civil-military cooperation (CIMIC) refers to the interaction between NATO-led forces and civil actors in alliance-led operations.

Civil Military Overview / Civil Military Fusion Centre
The Civil Military Overview (CMO) is an experimental portal supported by a dedicated information and knowledge management organization, the Civil Military Fusion Centre (CFC). Both are part of a development effort conducted by NATO Allied Command Transformation in consultation with various civil organizations. It is designed to improve interaction between civil and military actors. Through the CMO, NATO and its partners are exploring innovative ways to collect and disseminate all relevant civil and military information on Crisis Response Operations in order to begin creating a shared sense of situational awareness among the global community.

CECIL
The Working Group CECIL was established to streamline the CIMIC reporting. CECIL (Coordinated, Effect Based, CIMIC Information Link) intends to assist any NATO CIMIC staff and focuses on the CIMIC challenges of the 21st century. The aim is to share CIMIC knowledge proactively to facilitate the job of CIMIC staff at all levels. For this purpose, the CECIL platform was created as a tool to disseminate CIMIC-related information.

ACSP
The Afghanistan Country Stability Picture (ACSP) project is an initiative led by NATO's International Security Assistance Force (ISAF) to develop and maintain a comprehensive geographic database of reconstruction and development activities across Afghanistan. ACSP holds information about different Afghan national development strategy sectors such as education, good governance, health, agriculture and rural development, infrastructure and natural resources, private sector development, security, and social protection. The data held in the ACSP comes from several sources: the Government of Afghanistan (GOA), Provincial Reconstruction Teams (PRT), and international, governmental and non-governmental organizations (NGO). 
To provide efficient access to the ACSP data, NATO C3 agency developed a web map service. The ACSP web site can be used to consult and query the ACSP database over the internet. NATO, NGOs and the GOA can use it for optimization and monitoring of reconstruction efforts.

Abbreviations
ACOS: Assistant Chief of Staff
ACSP: Afghan Country Stability Picture
CIMIC: Civil Military Cooperation
ISAF: International Security Assistance Force (Afghanistan)
J9: CIMIC division in a Joint HQ
JC: Joint Command
JFC: Joint Force Command
SHAPE: Supreme Headquarters Allied Powers Europe

See also
Civil-military operations
Peace Support Training Centre

References

External links

Canadian CIMIC Operator Course Info
CIMIC Centre of Excellence
Civil Military Coordination, the United Nations' civilian corollary to CIMIC
Allied Joint Publication 9
CFC-CMO cimicweb
Web page of Multinatinal CIMIC Group in Motta di Livenza (ITA)
Australasian Civil Military Network (ACMN)

Civil affairs